Turatia turpicula is a moth in the family Autostichidae. It was described by László Anthony Gozmány in 2000. It is found in Namibia.

References

Endemic fauna of Namibia
Moths described in 2000
Turatia